Frank P. Brooks (September 22, 1850 - ?) was a farmer and state legislator in Mississippi. He represented Sharkey County in the Mississippi House of Representatives from 1886 to 1888.

He was born in Madison County, Mississippi He went to school in Vicksburg, Mississippi.

He was elected and re-elected to the Board of Supervisors but was asked to resign during his second term by a committee of whites. This occurred during a period of "disturbances" in the area of Deer Creek during which at least eight African Americans were killed.

References

People from Madison County, Mississippi
1850 births
Year of death missing
People from Sharkey County, Mississippi
Politicians from Vicksburg, Mississippi
Members of the Mississippi House of Representatives
Farmers from Mississippi
County supervisors in Mississippi